Kui may refer to:

People
Kui people, a Mon-Khmer ethnic minority
Kui Lee, a singer-songwriter

People with the surname Kui (奎)
Kui Yuanyuan, a Chinese gymnast

Places
Kui, Hiroshima, a Japanese town 
Kawau Island Airport, IATA code KUI, on Kawau Island

Astronomy
KUI 91AB, a variable star of Delta Cephei type
KUI 93AB, an eclipsing binary of Algol variable type

Other uses
Kui (Chinese mythology) 夔, a one-legged mountain demon, also legendary inventor of music and dance
Kui (dragonball), a manga character
Kui (music), comes from Kazakh language
Kui (Māori mythology), a chthonic Māori demigod, also father of Vahi-vero in Tuamotu mythology 
Kui kuningas nutab, a 1997 song by Terminaator
Kui language (India), a Dravidian language spoken by the Khonds
Kui language (Indonesia), a Timor–Alor–Pantar language
Kui the Horseclaw, a character in Nausicaä of the Valley of the Wind
KUI, acronym for Kinetic user interface

See also
 Kui language (disambiguation)